The 2017 Nacra 17 World Championship was held in La Grande-Motte, France, 5–10 September 2017.

Results

References

Nacra 17 World Championships
Nacra 17 World Championship
Sailing competitions in France
2017 in French sport